The 1975 Australian Formula 2 Championship was a CAMS sanctioned Australian motor racing title open to Racing Cars complying with Australian Formula 2 regulations. It was the ninth Australian Formula 2 Championship to be awarded by CAMS. The championship was won by Geoff Brabham, driving a Birrana 274 Ford.

Calendar
The championship was contested over a seven round series with one race per round.

Points system
Championship points were awarded on a 9-6-4-3-2-1 basis to the first six place-getters at each round.

Results

 Note: No points were awarded at the Sandown round as the race was stopped early due to heavy rain.

Notes and references

Australian Formula 2 Championship
Formula 2 Championship